Delaware Township is a township in Mercer County, Pennsylvania, United States. The population was 2,088 at the 2020 census, a decline from the figure of 2,291 in 2010.

History
The New Hamburg Historical Area was added to the National Register of Historic Places in 1974.

Geography

Demographics
As of the census of 2000, there were 2,159 people, 806 households, and 643 families residing in the township.  The population density was 66.5 people per square mile (25.7/km2).  There were 842 housing units at an average density of 25.9/sq mi (10.0/km2).  The racial makeup of the township was 98.98% White, 0.09% African American, 0.14% Native American, 0.09% Asian, 0.19% from other races, and 0.51% from two or more races. Hispanic or Latino of any race were 0.28% of the population.

There were 806 households, out of which 32.4% had children under the age of 18 living with them, 69.9% were married couples living together, 6.2% had a female householder with no husband present, and 20.2% were non-families. 17.5% of all households were made up of individuals, and 7.4% had someone living alone who was 65 years of age or older.  The average household size was 2.63 and the average family size was 2.97.

In the township the population was spread out, with 22.9% under the age of 18, 6.3% from 18 to 24, 27.9% from 25 to 44, 26.6% from 45 to 64, and 16.2% who were 65 years of age or older.  The median age was 41 years. For every 100 females there were 109.4 males.  For every 100 females age 18 and over, there were 102.2 males.

The median income for a household in the township was $42,240, and the median income for a family was $47,656. Males had a median income of $35,500 versus $24,917 for females. The per capita income for the township was $18,410.  About 7.2% of families and 9.3% of the population were below the poverty line, including 14.6% of those under age 18 and 5.3% of those age 65 or over.

References

Townships in Mercer County, Pennsylvania